Bromsgrove is a constituency in Worcestershire represented in the House of Commons of the UK Parliament since 2010 by Sajid Javid of the Conservative Party. Javid formerly served as Chancellor of the Exchequer, Home Secretary and Health Secretary.

Members of Parliament

MPs 1950–1974

MPs since 1983

Boundaries 

1950–1974: The Urban Districts of Bromsgrove and Redditch, and the Rural District of Bromsgrove. The constituency was renamed Bromsgrove and Redditch in 1974, but the boundaries remained unchanged until 1983.

1983–present: The District of Bromsgrove.

The constituency covers the same area as Bromsgrove District Council in north Worcestershire, with twenty civil parishes, although the town of Bromsgrove itself is unparished. It includes the villages of Alvechurch, Barnt Green, Belbroughton, Blackwell, Clent, Cofton Hackett, Hagley, Hollywood, Lickey, Marlbrook, Rubery, Tardebigge, and Wythall.

History 
The borough of Bromsgrove returned two members (Thomas Rassall and Thomas Barneford) to the original Model Parliament in 1295.  However,  borough status appeared lost when no other member was sent to any subsequent parliament under that status.

Since its split from the neighbouring Redditch Constituency in 1983, it has returned a Conservative Member of Parliament (MP).

The MP from 1997 to 2010, Julie Kirkbride, announced on 28 May 2009 that she would be standing down as an MP at the next General Election in light of the expenses scandal.  Her resignation was confirmed in December 2009, after an attempt to withdraw it.

The winner of the 2010 election, Sajid Javid (formerly the youngest Vice President of Chase Manhattan Bank and a Deutsche Bank board director) has held ministerial roles in Treasury as Economic Secretary and Financial Secretary. As well as Cabinet posts as Culture Secretary, Business Secretary, Communities Secretary, Home Secretary, Chancellor of the Exchequer and most recently as Health Secretary.

Elections

Elections in the 2010s

Elections in the 2000s

Elections in the 1990s

Elections in the 1980s

Elections in the 1970s

Elections in the 1960s

Elections in the 1950s

See also 
 List of parliamentary constituencies in Herefordshire and Worcestershire

Notes

References

External links 
nomis Constituency Profile for Bromsgrove — presenting data from the ONS annual population survey and other official statistics.

Parliamentary constituencies in Worcestershire
Constituencies of the Parliament of the United Kingdom established in 1950
Bromsgrove